Chamber of Horrors may refer to:

 The Door with Seven Locks (1940 film), a 1940 black-and-white British film, released in the United States as Chamber of Horrors
 Chamber of Horrors (1966 film), a 1966 horror film directed by Hy Averback
 Chamber of Horrors (1929 film), a 1929 British silent film directed by Walter Summers
 Chamber of Horrors (Madame Tussauds), famous for its waxworks of executed criminals and notorious persons